is a town located in Kumage District, Yamaguchi Prefecture, Japan.

In 2016, the town had an estimated population of 15,200 and a density of 300 persons per km². The total area is 50.35 km². 

In 2018, a civil servant reported property tax misconduct by the mayor of Tabuse and the head of the tax collection management agency.

Geography

Neighbouring municipalities 

 Hikari
 Iwakuni
 Yanai
 Hirao

Transportation

Railway 

 JR West
 San'yō Main Line: Tabuse Station

Highway 

 Japan National Route 188

Notable residents
 Nobusuke Kishi, Prime Minister of Japan from 1957 to 1960
 Kitamura Sayo, founder of Tenshō Kōtai Jingūkyō
 Eisaku Satō, Prime Minister of Japan from 1964 to 1972 and younger brother of Kishi

References

External links
 
 Tabuse official website 

Towns in Yamaguchi Prefecture